No Illusions is the second studio album by British psychedelic rock/shoegaze band SULK, released on 15 April 2016 on Perfect Sound Forever.

Track listing
Black Infinity (Upside Down)
The Only Faith Is Love
No Illusions
Drifting
One Day
Past Paradise
Queen Supreme
Love Can't Save You Now
The Tape Of You
Another Man Fades Dawn

References

2016 albums
Sulk (British band) albums